Laphria gilva is a species of robber flies in the family Asilidae.

References

gilva
Articles created by Qbugbot
Flies described in 1758
Taxa named by Carl Linnaeus